Desmodema polystictum, also called the deal fish, polka-dot ribbonfish, or spotted ribbonfish, is a fish in the family Trachipteridae. It is found near New Zealand, the northwestern Atlantic Ocean, and South Africa. The species became more known when James Douglas Ogilby wrote and published work on the species in 1898.

Related species
 Desmodema lorum, the whiptail ribbonfish, is the only other species in its genus.

References

External links
World Register of Marine Species link
ITIS Report
Harvard Cooperative Museum of Zoology Databse entry

Trachipteridae
Fish described in 1898